The 4th Nuestra Belleza México pageant, was held at the Salon Teotihuacan of the Centro Internacional de Convenciones Acapulco of Acapulco, Guerrero, Mexico on September 20, 1997. Thirty-two contestants of the Mexican Republic competed for the national title, which was won by Katty Fuentes from Nuevo León, who later competed at Miss Universe 1998 in the US. Fuentes was crowned by outgoing Nuestra Belleza México titleholder Rebeca Tamez. She was the first Neoleonesa to win this title.

The Nuestra Belleza Mundo México] title was won by Blanca Soto from Morelos, who later competed at Miss World 1997 in Seychelles. Soto was crowned by outgoing Nuestra Belleza Mundo México titleholder Yessica Salazar. She is the first and only short hair to win as well she was the first Morelense to win this Title.

For the second consecutive time, two events were held separately to select the two winners for the titles Nuestra Belleza México and Nuestra Belleza Mundo México.

Results

Nuestra Belleza México

Nuestra Belleza Mundo México
One week before the Final Competition was held the Preliminary Competition with a live show entitled  "Nuestra Belleza Mexico: Rumbo a Miss Mundo" in which was announced the winner of the Nuestra Belleza Mundo México title Blanca Soto from Morelos who represented the country at Miss World 1997. All contestants competed in swimsuit and evening gown during the contest.

The Nuestra Belleza Mundo México pageant was held at the Salon Teotihuacan of the Centro Internacional de Convenciones Acapulco in Acapulco, Guerrero, Mexico and was hosted by Raúl Velasco and Karina Velasco. It was the 2nd edition of the "Nuestra Belleza Mundo México" contest and as an Official separate pageant to choose Mexico's representative to Miss World. Although the Winner of this event also competed in the Final Competition, but finished as Suplente/1st Runner-up.

The musical part was enlivened by: Sentidos Opuestos, Mœnia, Paulina Rubio and Vicente Fernández.

Contestants

Judges

Preliminary competition
Carlos Latapi – Photographer
Rebeca Solano – Fashion Coordinator
Tony Scheffler – Journalist
Eugenia Cauduro – Model & Actress
Mario Cimarro – Actor
Rosario Pérez – Fashion Coordinator

References

External links
 Official Website

.México
1997 in Mexico
1997 beauty pageants